Qin Kai is the name of:
Qin Kai (general) ( 300 BC), general of the state of Yan during the Warring States period
Qin Kai (diver) (born 1986), Chinese diver